Firland is a children's fantasy book series by Norman Sandiford Power. The third book appears to have only been published in Denmark.

Books
The Forgotten Kingdom aka The Forgotten Kingdom: The Firland Saga aka *The Firland Saga (novel) (1970, 1973)
Fear in Firland (novel) (1974)
Firland i flammer (novel) (1974)

References

Series of children's books
1970s children's books